The illegal drug trade in Aruba involves trans-shipment of cocaine and other drugs through Aruba to the United States.

Background
Corruption in Aruba is so widespread that Claire Sterling, widely acclaimed for her works on drugs and crime, said of it: "The world's first independent mafia state emerged in 1993." The Italian daily Corriere della Sera described Aruba as "the first state to be bought by the bosses Cosa Nostra." Between 1988 and 1992 the Cuntrera-Caruana Mafia clan was said to have acquired 60% of Aruba through investments in hotels, casinos and the election-campaign of a Prime Minister. As a result of the public outcry, Aruba's independence from the Netherlands, planned for 1996, was cancelled.

Decline
While drug trafficking through Aruba used to be a major issue, it is much less so today. Aruba was removed from the US State Department’s list of major drug producing and transit countries in 1999. The reason for this decline is unclear. Case Study

See also 
Designer drug
Drug liberalization
Drug policy of the Netherlands
Legality of cannabis by country
Minors and the legality of cannabis

References 

Aruba
Drugs in Aruba
Aruba
Aruba